Dorylomorpha haemorrhoidalis is a species of fly in the family Pipunculidae.

Distribution
Great Britain, Denmark, Estonia, Finland, Germany, Latvia, Lithuania, Russia, Norway, Sweden, Ukraine.

References

Pipunculidae
Insects described in 1838
Diptera of Europe
Taxa named by Johan Wilhelm Zetterstedt